Baron Cunliffe, of Headley in the County of Surrey, is a title in the Peerage of the United Kingdom. It was created in 1914 for Walter Cunliffe, Governor of the Bank of England from 1913 to 1918.  the title is held by his grandson, the third Baron, who succeeded his father in 1963.

Barons Cunliffe (1914)
Walter Cunliffe, 1st Baron Cunliffe (1855–1920)
Rolf Cunliffe, 2nd Baron Cunliffe (1899–1963)
Roger Cunliffe, 3rd Baron Cunliffe (b. 1932)

The heir apparent is the present holder's son the Hon. Henry Cunliffe (b. 1962)

Arms

Notes

References
Kidd, Charles, Williamson, David (editors). Debrett's Peerage and Baronetage (1990 edition). New York: St Martin's Press, 1990, 

Baronies in the Peerage of the United Kingdom
Noble titles created in 1914